Ruslan "Russ" Salakhutdinov is a Canadian researcher of Tatar origin working in the field of artificial intelligence.

He specializes in deep learning, probabilistic graphical models, and large-scale optimization.

Life 

Salakhutdinov's doctoral advisor was Geoffrey Hinton. Salakhutdinov was considering quitting the field of artificial intelligence when he met Hinton in 2014, but changed his mind after Hinton asked him to take part in a project focused on a new way to train artificial neural networks, which he dubbed "deep belief networks." This research made a large impact on the field of deep learning.

He received his PhD in 2009.

He is well known for having developed Bayesian Program Learning.

Career 

Salakhutdinov is a professor of computer science at Carnegie Mellon University.

Since 2009, he has published at least 42 papers on machine learning.

His research has been funded by Google, Microsoft and Samsung. In 2016, Salakhutdinov joined Apple as its director of AI research.

Awards 

He is a CIFAR fellow.

References

External links
 
 

Year of birth missing (living people)
Living people
Canadian computer scientists
Carnegie Mellon University faculty